of Bitchū Province was a Japanese castle in what is today the city of Okayama in Okayama Prefecture. Like most Japanese castles, it was built in the late 16th century, during the Azuchi–Momoyama period.

History
The castle, of the hirajō (plains castle) type, was built very close to sea level, on marshy ground that formed something of a natural moat. This distinguishes it from the more stereotypical image of a yamashiro (mountain castle), built atop a hill.

It was originally built by the Mimura family and controlled by their vassals, the Ishikawa family. Both families were eliminated as significant powers by the Mōri clan, who seized Takamatsu, and all of Bitchu province, in 1575. The Mōri entrusted the castle to their vassal Shimizu Muneharu.

Shimizu was closely related to the Ishikawa family. It's possible that he was already lord of Takamatsu shortly before the Mōri attacked, turning to their side upon the defeat of the Ishikawa, to maintain his prestige and power, along with the castle.

In 1582, the castle was besieged by Toyotomi Hideyoshi. After a month or two of siege, Hideyoshi built dikes to divert a nearby river, at the suggestion of his strategist Kuroda Kanbei, and flooded the castle, leading to a quick surrender on the part of Shimizu. The ease with which this was accomplished was brought about in great part due to the marshy condition of the area and the timing of the siege: the rainy season (tsuyu) exacerbated the flooding to such an extent that it is easy to imagine the fortress truly being flooded and surrender becoming inevitable.

Following this siege, and the rise and fall of Toyotomi Hideyoshi, the castle came to be controlled by the Hanabusa family, karō of the Ukita family. Following the battle of Sekigahara in 1600, in which the Hanabusa fought alongside the army of Tokugawa Ieyasu, they were awarded hatamoto status; ranked higher than most daimyō (feudal lords), the hatamoto were among the shōgun's most trusted retainers. Some years later the daimyō residence was moved from Takamatsu to Abe, in what is today Sōja city.

Today, though some remnants of Hideyoshi's dikes and siege towers remain, signs of the castle do not. A stone monument marks the spot where Shimizu Muneharu committed seppuku, and the whole surrounding area has been made a park, Takamatsu Castle Water-Siege Historic Park (高松城水攻め史跡公園, Takamatsu-jō mizuzeme shiseki kōen). Archaeological markers, such as wooden posts, show the area where the castle, dikes, and siege equipment were.

On April 6, 2017 Bitchu Takamatsu Castle, the castle was designated by the Japanese Castle Foundation as Okayama Prefecture's only entry on the Continued Top 100 Japanese Castles (続日本100名城). The list adds to the original Top 100 list totaling 200 castles. Bitchu Takamatsu Castle is listed as #171.

In popular culture 
Takamatsu Castle was featured in the video game Soulcalibur by Namco, used as the fighting stage for the character Heishiro Mitsurugi. The game contains two versions of the stage, one set during the siege and the other set in the winter following it.

Literature

References 

 Much of the content here is derived from that on the corresponding article on the Japanese Wikipedia.
 Sansom, George (1961). A History of Japan: 1334–1615. Stanford, California: Stanford University Press
 Turnbull, Stephen (1998). The Samurai Sourcebook. London: Cassell & Co.

Takamatsu castle (Bitchu)
Castles in Okayama Prefecture
Historic Sites of Japan
Mōri clan
Ruined castles in Japan